Rinat Rashidovich Ibragimov (born March 7, 1986) is a Russian professional ice hockey defenceman currently playing for HC Kunlun Red Star in the Kontinental Hockey League (KHL).

In the 2015–16 season, Ibragimov joined Khabarovsk in a mid-season trade after contributing with 6 points in 28 games with the HC Sibir Novosibirsk on November 30, 2015. He produce a further 5 points in 22 games with Khabarovsk before opting to leave as a free agent in the off-season to join HC Sochi on a one-year deal on May 1, 2016.

International

References

External links

Rinat Ibragimov's player profile and career stats at Russian Prospects

1986 births
Amur Khabarovsk players
HC Kunlun Red Star players
HC Lada Togliatti players
HK Poprad players
HC Yugra players
Living people
Metallurg Magnitogorsk players
Russian ice hockey defencemen
HC Sibir Novosibirsk players
HC Sochi players
Tatar people of Russia
Tatar sportspeople
People from Magnitogorsk
Sportspeople from Chelyabinsk Oblast
Kazakhstani ice hockey defencemen
Sportspeople from Oskemen
Russian expatriate sportspeople in Slovakia
Russian expatriate sportspeople in China
Russian expatriate ice hockey people